Tarrytown station is a commuter rail stop on the Metro-North Railroad's Hudson Line, located in  Tarrytown, New York. It is one of two express stations on that line south of Croton–Harmon, along with Ossining, that serve most trains, excluding peak hour trains to/from Poughkeepsie. The Tappan Zee Bridge is not far from the station, resulting in its use by Rockland County commuters.

History
The Tarrytown station was first used by commuters in 1890.
The original station building, which also served as the terminus of John D. Rockefeller's private telegraph wire to his home in Pocantico Hills, was destroyed in a fire caused by a cigarette in April 1922. Plans for a new station were completed three years later in October 1925.

Almost 120 years after the station first went into use, an announcement was made in November 2007 concerning a large scale refurbishment of the station as part of the second phase of MTA's Capital Program. The renovated building will include a ticket agent and waiting area, new heated overpasses, stairways and elevators as well as new platforms. Metro-North has set aside $3.5 million for the project with the expectation that design work would be completed by the second quarter of 2008. Work at the Tarrytown station began in October 2009 and was completed, under budget and on schedule in 2012. 

In March 2020, a bakery named The Bakehouse of Tarrytown opened inside the former station building.

Station layout
The station has two slightly offset high-level platforms, each able to accommodate 10 cars. The station has several parking options. The station is currently served by a number of bus lines, including the Westchester Bee-Line, Lower Hudson Transit Link as well as a number of other connections. The station was forrmely served by the Tappan Zee Express, which was discontinued in 2018. Historically, the station was connected to other Westchester County communities via a trolley.

References

External links 

Entrance from Google Maps Street View

Metro-North Railroad stations in New York (state)
Former New York Central Railroad stations
Tarrytown, New York
Railway stations in Westchester County, New York
Railway stations in the United States opened in 1849
1849 establishments in New York (state)